The Nationalist Canarian Initiative (ICAN), initially called Canarian Initiative, was a nationalist political party in the Canary Islands founded in 1991.

History
ICAN was founded in 1991, being originally was linked to the Canarian United Left (IUC) until a few months after the municipal elections of 1991, when a conflict arose between these two organizations. The PSOE ruled the Cabildo of Gran Canaria, but ICAN filed a censure motion (with the support of CDS and the PP). Following the motion of censure ICAN was expelled of IUC.

In 1993 ICAN merged with the AIC (Canarian Independent Groups), AM (Majorera Assembly), PNC (Canarian Nationalist Party) and CCN (Nationalist Canarian Centre) to form Canarian Coalition.

See also
 Canarian nationalism
 Canarian Coalition
 Canarian People's Union

References

1991 establishments in Spain
Canarian nationalist parties
Defunct nationalist parties in Spain
Defunct social democratic parties in Spain
Left-wing nationalist parties
Political parties established in 1991
Political parties in the Canary Islands